This is a list of episodes from the eleventh season of Real Time with Bill Maher. The show is broadcast on HBO, with new episodes premiering on Friday nights. It is also available through podcasts on iTunes.

Note that current/upcoming elections are frequent topics on the show and may not be listed under individual episodes.

Episodes

External links 
 Real Time with Bill Maher Free (audio-only) episodes & Overtime podcast direct from HBO
 HBO.com Episode List
 TV.com Episode Guide
 

Real Time with Bill Maher
Real Time with Bill Maher seasons